Freiburg is an electoral constituency (German: Wahlkreis) represented in the Bundestag. It elects one member via first-past-the-post voting. Under the current constituency numbering system, it is designated as constituency 281. It is located in southwestern Baden-Württemberg, comprising the city of Freiburg im Breisgau and northwestern parts of the district of Breisgau-Hochschwarzwald.

Freiburg was created for the inaugural 1949 federal election. Since 2021, it has been represented by Chantal Kopf of the Alliance 90/The Greens.

Geography
Freiburg is located in southwestern Baden-Württemberg. As of the 2021 federal election, it comprises the independent city of Freiburg im Breisgau and the municipalities of Au, Bötzingen, Bollschweil, Breisach am Rhein, Ebringen, Ehrenkirchen, Eichstetten am Kaiserstuhl, Gottenheim, Horben, Ihringen, March, Merdingen, Merzhausen, Pfaffenweiler, Schallstadt, Sölden, Umkirch, Vogtsburg im Kaiserstuhl, and Wittnau from the Breisgau-Hochschwarzwald district.

History
Freiburg was created in 1949. In the 1949 election, it was Baden constituency 4 in the numbering system. In the 1953 through 1961 elections, it was number 186. In the 1965 through 1976 elections, it was number 190. In the 1980 through 1998 elections, it was number 185. In the 2002 and 2005 elections, it was number 282. Since the 2009 election, it has been number 281.

Originally, the constituency comprised the independent city of Freiburg im Breisgau and the Landkreis Freiburg district. In the 1980 election, it acquired a configuration similar to its current borders, but including the municipalities of Glottertal, Gundelfingen, Heuweiler, Kirchzarten, Oberried, Sankt Märgen, Sankt Peter, and Stegen from the Breisgau-Hochschwarzwald district. It acquired its current borders in the 2002 election.

Members
The constituency has been held by Christian Democratic Union (CDU) during all but four Bundestag terms since its creation. It was first represented by Hermann Kopf from 1949 to 1969, followed by Hans Evers from 1969 to 1980. Conrad Schroeder was representative from 1980 to 1994, followed by Sigrun Löwisch from 1994 to 1998. Gernot Erler of the Social Democratic Party (SPD) was elected in 1998 and served until 2013. Matern von Marschall of the CDU was representative from 2013 to 2021. Chantal Kopf won the constituency for the Greens in 2021.

Election results

2021 election

2017 election

2013 election

2009 election

Notes

References

Federal electoral districts in Baden-Württemberg
1949 establishments in West Germany
Constituencies established in 1949
Freiburg im Breisgau
Breisgau-Hochschwarzwald